ASC Oțelul Galați is a professional football club which currently plays in Liga II.

Total statistics

Statistics by country

Statistics by competition 

Notes for the abbreviations in the tables below:

 1R: First round
 2R: Second round
 3R: Third round
 1QR: First qualifying round
 2QR: Second qualifying round

UEFA Champions League

UEFA Europa League / UEFA Cup

UEFA Intertoto Cup

Top scorers

External links
  Official website
  UEFA website
  European cups archive

Otelul Galati
ASC Oțelul Galați